is a 2014 tactical role-playing game by Kadokawa Games for the PlayStation 3, PlayStation 4 and PlayStation Vita.

Development
The game was announced at the SCEJA Press Conference in September 2013. It is the first title that is solely developed by Kadokawa. The game was originally intended to be a release title for the PlayStation 4, however was delayed twice, to April 2014.

Atsushi Ii, previously known for directing Patapon, led the development team as director. Atsushi Ikariya, responsible for character designs for Fate/Zero, designed the characters alongside ufotable. The producers are Yoshimi Yasuda and Kensuke Tanaka. The game's soundtrack was composed by Noriyuki Asakura, with the ending theme song being an arrangement of "The Court of the Crimson King" by King Crimson.

The game was localised by NIS America for the North American and European release in Q3 2014.

A major update released on July 10, 2014 added a new easy mode to the game, following initial complaints by players in Japan that the game is too difficult. In addition, a more detailed tutorial is introduced, each level has strategy hints included, and the number of save checkpoints has been increased. The player can also speed up the actions of enemies. Three additional online co-op missions were included for all platforms, plus a set of extra hard missions for PlayStation 4 players.

Gameplay
The game is a fantasy simulation-type RPG based along the concept of natural selection. The game features single and multiplayer modes with versus and co-operative play, and is cross-play and cross-save compatible.

The game storyline is shown from the perspective of Geoff, the main protagonist, who is accompanied by two women named Vasily and Anka. Combat is based on a turn-based battle system, and a primary concept of gameplay is to have large numbers of allies and enemies simultaneously on a large size battlefield. Time can be controlled dynamically, and units can be controlled in a single space. Units in combat against one another form encampments, where units are able to return to camp at the end of the turn as long as the encampment isn't destroyed. Units are also able to hide behind objects.

Outside of Feste, species such as minotaurs, goblins and orcs set up bases, and intend on attacking from them. The field is wide and arranged within grid limits. In multiplayer mode, players can play as non-human species.

The online mode will feature a card battle game, where players can compete against one another with their own formulated decks.

Setting
The setting is within a universe where humans fight other races with magic and swords. Within a world of chaos, humans built the fortress city Feste as their home, and fought against other species. The protagonist, Geoff, is a guard soldier set out to clear out goblin dens to grant access to resources important for humankind.

Characters
Geoff: The young male protagonist, who uses one and two-handed swords, in addition to guns. Class: All-round Warrior. Voiced by: Kyle Hebert (English); Gou Inoue (Japanese).
Vasily: A young female guard soldier, and a comrade of Geoff. Class: Warrior. Voiced by: Ayane Sakura.
Anka: Girl with long blonde ponytail, and a leader of the tunnel pathfinder brigade. Skilled at generalship and medical assistance, and fights with a rifle. Class: Command Medic. Voiced by: Risako Murai.
Zekelinde: Seasoned human male warrior who specialises in double-handed weapons. Has a long and distinguished military service. Class: SwordMaster. Voiced by: Yoshihisa Kawahara.
Mel: A young human girl, whose innocent look belies her ability to control giant stone golems. Class: Golem Handler. Voiced by: Sarah Anne Williams (English); Rina Hidaka (Japanese).
Nebula: A male apprentice wizard. Class: Apprentice. Voiced by: Seichirou Yamashita.
Tatyana: Short-haired human girl who grew up as a war orphan. Uses firearms. Class: Marksman. Voiced by: Aya Suzaki.
Ernestine/Erna: The older sister of Vasily. She was part of the Ritterorden. Voiced by: Ayumi Fujimura.
Ingbert: A mage of high birth who is a member of the city Senate. Contemptuous of people of low birth. Class: Wizard. Voiced by: Hiroki Touchi.
Gomori: A mysterious woman of indeterminate species, though she bears a human-like aspect. Class: Unknown. Voiced by: Yuka Iguchi.

Reception

The game sold relatively few copies within the first week of release in Japan, with only 18,000 physical retail copies sold across the three separate platforms that week. As of July 2014, the game sold over 50,000 copies across the three platforms.

The PlayStation 3 version of Natural Doctrine received 31/40 from Japanese magazine Famitsu, while the PlayStation Vita version received a score of 30/40. Cory Galliher of Popzara said that the easy mode means the game "isn’t a total loss for those of us who don’t have the tactical mind of Patton and the patience of Gandhi", but also added that "despite this, it’s hard to recommend the game to any but the most hardcore SRPG players."

Heath Hindman of PlayStation LifeStyle gave the game a 4/10, commenting that although the game mechanics were interesting, the user interface and level design required additional improvement, and the pacing of the game felt slower than it should. Hardcore Gamer gave the game a 3/5, calling it "punishing, unfair at times and hell-bent on funneling players through a narrow corridor that leaves little-to-no room for tactical experimentation." Chris Gollmer of Niche Gamer both praised it for and complained about its punishing gameplay, concluding that "hardcore" strategy RPG players would find it satisfying, but that it was too difficult for anyone else to justify an investment.

References

External links
   
  

2014 video games
PlayStation Vita games
PlayStation 3 games
Fantasy video games
PlayStation 4 games
Kadokawa Shoten games
Tactical role-playing video games
Video games developed in Japan
Video games scored by Noriyuki Asakura
Video games with cross-platform play
Video games related to anime and manga